The Causey Arch is a bridge near Stanley in County Durham, northern England. It is the oldest surviving single-arch railway bridge in the world, and a key element of the industrial heritage of England. It carried an early wagonway (horse-drawn carts on wooden rails) to transport coal. The line was later diverted, and no longer uses the bridge.

History
It was built in 1725–26 by stonemason Ralph Wood, funded by a conglomeration of coal-owners known as the "Grand Allies" (founded by Colonel Liddell, the Hon. Charles Montague and George Bowes the owner of Gibside Estate on which the bridge is situated) at a cost of £12,000.  Two tracks crossed the Arch: one (the "main way") to take coal to the River Tyne, and the other (the "bye way") for returning the empty wagons. Over 900 horse-drawn wagons crossed the arch each day using the Tanfield Railway.

After he designed the bridge, Ralph Wood was so afraid that his arch would collapse that he committed suicide in 1727, but the bridge still stands today. An inscription on a sundial at the site reads "Ra. Wood, mason, 1727".

Use of the arch declined when Tanfield Colliery was destroyed by fire in 1739.

Present status
The Arch has been Grade I listed since 1950. It was restored and reinforced in the 1980s. There are a series of scenic public paths around the area and the Causey Burn which runs underneath it. The quarry near the bridge is a popular spot for local rock climbers.

Causey Burn itself flows into Beamish Burn which then flows into the River Team eventually discharging into the River Tyne.

See also
Brandling Junction Railway

References

 Skempton, A.W. (2002) Biographical Dictionary of Civil Engineers in Great Britain and Northern Ireland, Volume 1, 1500–1830, p 791–792. Published by Thomas Telford Ltd.

External links

Waggonway Research Circle
Causey Arch Picnic Area, a leaflet produced by Durham County Council
Durham Mining Museum Archives
Causey Arch at structurae
Tanfield Waggonway at Sunniside Local History Group

Railway bridges in County Durham
Tourist attractions in County Durham
Grade I listed buildings in County Durham
Grade I listed railway bridges and viaducts
Bridges completed in 1726
Industrial archaeological sites in England
Arch bridges in the United Kingdom
1726 establishments in Great Britain
Stanley, County Durham